Krishna Tere Desh Main is a 2000 film produced and directed by Shiv Kumar. Music by Ravindra Jain.

Cast
 Ashok Sharma
 Chetan
 Dev Sharma
 Asrani
 Johny Lever
 Manek Pramanik
 Raza Murad
 Poonam Dasgupta
 Raju Shrivastav
 Upasana Singh
 Ramesh Goyal
 Renu Sharma

References

2000 films
2000s Hindi-language films